Notable high schools in South Africa include (listed by province):

Eastern Cape 
 Clarendon High School for Girls, East London
 Dale College, King William's Town
 Diocesan School for Girls, Grahamstown
 Get Ahead College, Komani
 Gill College, Somerset East
 Graeme College, Makhanda
 Grey High School, Port Elizabeth
 Hoërskool Brandwag, Uitenhage
 Hudson Park High School, East London
 Jonguhlanga Senior Secondary School, East London
 Khulani Commercial High School, Mdantsane
 Kingswood College, Grahamstown
 Khwezi Lomso Comprehensive High, Zwide
 Lawson Brown High School
Loyiso High School, Zwide
 Muir College, Uitenhage
 Molly Blackburn High School, Uitenhage
 Mxhume Secondary School, Lusikisiki
Ndzondelelo High School, Zwide
 Nomaka Mbeki Technical Senior Secondary School, Dutywa
 Ntsonkotha Senior Secondary School, Lady Frere
 Port Alfred High School, Port Alfred
 Port Rex Technical High School, East London
 Queen's College, Queenstown
 Riebeek College, Uitenhage
 Selborne College, East London
 Cambridge high school, East London
 St. Andrew's College, Grahamstown
 St. Matthew's High School, Keiskammahoek
 Stirling High School, East London
Saint Georges Senior Secondary School, Mount Frere
 Victoria Girls' High School, Grahamstown
 Victoria Park High School, Port Elizabeth
 West Bank High School, East London
 Westering High School, Port Elizabeth
 Westville Senior Secondary High School, Port Elizabeth
 Woodridge College, Thornhill

Free State 
 Grey College, Bloemfontein
 Hoërskool Jim Fouché, Bloemfontein
 Bloemfontein High School, Bloemfontein
 Hoërskool Sentraal, Bloemfontein
 Hoërskool Fichardtpark, Bloemfontein
 St. Andrew's School, Bloemfontein
 St. Michael's School, Bloemfontein
 Hoërskool Sentraal, Bloemfontein
 Hoërskool Ficksburg, Ficksburg, Ficksburg
 Phehello High School, Kutlwanong
 Sasolburg High School, Sasolburg
 Bethlehem Voortrekker High School, Bethlehem
Trio High school , Kroonstad 

 Riebeeckstad high school Welkom
 Henties Cilliers Hoërskool,Virginia
 Nkgopoleng high school
 Iketsetseng Comprehensive Secondary School
 Cedar Secondary School

Gauteng

Johannesburg 
 African Leadership Academy, Honeydew
 Allen Glen High School, Allens Nek, Roodepoort
 Athlone Boys' High School, Kensington, Johannesburg
 Aurora Private School, Randburg
 Barnato Park High School, Johannesburg
 Beaulieu College, Kyalami
 Bryanston High School, Bryanston
 Crawford College, Sandton
 Fourways High School, Johannesburg
 Greenside High School, Johannesburg
 Hoërskool Florida, Roodepoort
 Hoërskool Noordheuwel, Krugersdorp
 Itirele Zenzele Comprehensive high school 
 Hoërskool Monument, Krugersdorp
 Jeppe High School for Boys, Johannesburg
 Jeppe High School for Girls, Johannesburg
 King David Schools, Johannesburg
 King Edward VII School, Johannesburg
 Kingsmead College, Johannesburg
Letsibogo Girls' High School, Meadowlands
 Meadowlands Secondary School, Soweto
 Michael Mount Waldorf School, Bryanston
 Morris Isaacson High School, Soweto
 Naledi High School, Soweto
 Northcliff High School, Johannesburg
 Parktown Boys' High School, Johannesburg
 Redhill School, Sandton
 Roedean School, Johannesburg
 Sacred Heart College, Johannesburg
 Sandown High School, Sandton
 Sandringham High School, Johannesburg
 Sheikh Anta Diop College, Yeoville
 Sir John Adamson Secondary School, Johannesburg
 Springs Boys' High School, Springs, Johannesburg
 St Benedict's College, Bedfordview, Johannesburg
 St David's Marist, Inanda, Sandton
 St Mary's School, Waverley, Johannesburg
 St Peter's College, Sandton
 St Stithians College, Randburg
 St. Andrew's School for Girls, Johannesburg
 St. John's College, Johannesburg
 St. Martin's School, Johannesburg
 Torah Academy School, Johannesburg
 Unity Secondary School, Daveyton
 Waverley Girls' High School, Johannesburg
 Westridge High School, Roodepoort
 Yeshiva College of South Africa, Johannesburg

East Rand 

 Alberton high school,Alberton

 Boksburg High School
 Christian Brothers' College, Boksburg
 Germiston High School
 Glenbrack High School, Alberton
 Hoërskool Alberton
 Hoërskool Dinamika, Alberton
 Hoërskool Marais Viljoen, Alberton
 Springs Boys' High School
 St Benedict's College, Bedfordview
 St Catherine's School, Germiston
 St Dominic's Catholic School for Girls, Boksburg
 St Dunstan's College, Benoni
 Hoërskool Voortrekker, Boksburg
 Thuto Ke Matla Comprehensive School,Thembisa,Gauteng

Pretoria 
 Afrikaanse Hoër Meisieskool, Pretoria
 Afrikaanse Hoër Seunskool, Pretoria
 Christian Brothers' College, Mount Edmund, Pretoria
 Clapham High School, Pretoria
 Cornerstone College
 Cornwall Hill College
 Crawford College, Pretoria, Pretoria
 CVO Skool Pretoria, Pretoria
 Excelsior Rooihuiskraal Akademie, Pretoria
 Hillview High School, Pretoria
 Hoërskool Eldoraigne, Pretoria
 Hoërskool Menlopark, Pretoria
 Hoërskool Oos-Moot, Pretoria
 Hoërskool Overkruin
 Hoërskool Raslouw
 Hoërskool Waterkloof, Pretoria
 Hoërskool Wonderboom, Pretoria
 Langenhoven High School, Pretoria
 Lyttelton Manor High School, Pretoria
 Pretoria Boys High School
 Pretoria High School for Girls
 Pretoria Secondary School
 Pro Arte Alphen Park
 Southdowns College, Irene
 St. Alban's College, Pretoria
 St. Mary's Diocesan School for Girls, Pretoria
 Sutherland High School, Centurion
 The Glen High School, Pretoria
 Tshwane Muslim School
 Willowridge High School, Pretoria

Hammanskraal 
 Mamelodi High School, Mamelodi
 Boitumelo High School, Sebokeng

KwaZulu-Natal 
 Brettonwood High School, Durban
 Clifton School, Durban
 Durban Girls' College, Durban
 Durban Girls' High School, Durban
 Durban High School, Durban
 Durban North College, Durban
 Michaelhouse 
 Folweni High School, Folweni
 George Campbell School of Technology, Durban
 Glenwood High School (Durban)
 Hillcrest High School, Hillcrest
 Kearsney College, Botha's Hill
 Kingsway High School, Amanzimtoti
 Kloof High School, Kloof
 Maris Stella School, Durban
 Northlands Girls' High School, Durban
 Northwood School, Durban
 Ntwenhle High School, Durban
 Orient Islamic School, Durban
 Pinetown Boys' High School, Pinetown
 Pinetown Girls' High School, Pinetown
 Port Natal High School, Durban
 Queensburgh Girls' High School, Queensburgh
 Siphephele High School, Durban
 St Benedict School Pinetown
 St. Henry's Marist Brothers' College, Durban
 St. Mary's Diocesan School for Girls, Kloof
 St. Patrick's College, Kokstad
 Thomas More College, Kloof
 Westville Boys' High School, Westville
 Westville Girls' High School, Westville
St Francis college

Pietermaritzburg and surrounding areas 
 Alexandra High School, Pietermaritzburg
 Carter High School, Pietermaritzburg
 Deutsche Schule, Hermannsburg
 Edendale Technical High School
 Epworth High School, Pietermaritzburg
 Grace College, Hilton, Pietermaritzburg
 Heritage Academy (Pietermaritzburg), Pietermaritzburg
 Hilton College, Hilton
 Howick High School, Howick
 Linpark High School, Pietermaritzburg
 Maritzburg College, Pietermaritzburg
 Pholela High School, Bulwer
 Pietermaritzburg Girls' High School, Pietermaritzburg
 Russell High School, Pietermaritzburg
 St. Anne's Diocesan College, Hilton
 St. Charles College, Pietermaritzburg
 St. John's Diocesan School for Girls, Pietermaritzburg
 The Wykeham Collegiate, Pietermaritzburg
 Voortrekker High School, Pietermaritzburg

Midlands 
 Drakensberg Boys' Choir School, Winterton
 Estcourt High School, Estcourt
 Ferrum High School, Newcastle
 Michaelhouse, Balgowan
 Treverton College, Mooi River

North Coast and Zululand 
 Ashton International College, Ballito
 Ohlange High School
 Stanger Manor Secondary School, Stanger
 Stanger Secondary School, Stanger
 Sunnydale High School, Eshowe
 Eshowe High School, Eshowe
Ingqungqulu High School , Emolweni
 Sinethezekile Combined School, Jozini
 Igugulesizwe Secondary School, Jozini
 Biva Combined School, Jozini
 Injula Secondary School, Gendleza
 Vryheid High School, Vryheid
 Vryheid Landbou High School, Vryheid
 Inkamana High School, Vryheid
 Mathunjwa High School, Vryheid

Umdoni
 Gugulesizwe High School, Amandawe Mission
 Hluzingqondo High School, Amahlongwa Mission
 Mdoni Christian Academy, Umzinto
 Mkomaas Secondary School, Umkomaas
 Mzinto Secondary School, Umzinto
 Phindavele High School, Dududu
 Roseville Secondary School, Umzinto
 Scottburgh High School, Scottburgh

Hibiscus Coast 
 Port Shepstone High School, Port Shepstone
 Port Shepstone Secondary School

Limpopo 
 Kabelo High School, Polokwane 
 Gojela High School, Mahwelereng
 Lebowakgomo High School, Lebowakgomo
 Leolo High School, Burgersfort
 Luphai Secondary School, Limpopo
 Mbilwi Secondary School,
 Lemana High School, Elim
mamokutupi secondary,Limpopo
 Mookamedi Secondary School, Jakkalskuil
 Phiri Kolobe High, Mankweng
 Harry Oppenheimer Agricultural High School, Limburg
 St Mark's College, Jane Furse
 St Paul's High School, Luckau
 Stanford Lake College, Haenertsburg
 Vhulaudzi Secondary School, Vhulaudzi
Ramasete High School,Ga-Sekororo,Turkey Zone4,Chabelang
hivuyeriweile commercial high school, dzingidzingi village, Giyani

Mpumalanga 
 Hoërskool Generaal Hertzog, eMalahleni
 Barberton High School, Barberton
 Hoërskool Oosterland, Secunda
 Hoërskool Rob Ferreira High School, White River, Mpumalanga
 Penryn College, Nelspruit
Cyril clark high school

Northern Cape

Kimberley 
 Diamantveld High School
 Homevale High School
 HTS Kimberley
 Kimberley Boys' High School
 Kimberley Girls' High School
 St. Patrick's CBC
 St. Boniface High School (C.B.C)

North West Province 
 Hoërskool Schweizer Reneke, Schweizer-Reneke
 J M Ntsime High School, Rustenburg
 Ntebogang Secondary School, Dinokana, Zeerust
 Potchefstroom Gimnasium, Potchefstroom
 Potchefstroom High School for Boys, Potchefstroom
 Tsogo High School, Mmakau
 Vryburg High School, Vryburg

Western Cape 

 Brackenfell High School, Brackenfell
 Vredendal High School, Vredendal
 Fairmont High School, Durbanville
 False Bay High School, Strand
 Hoërskool Durbanville, Durbanville
 Parel Vallei High School, Somerset West
 Stellenberg High School, Bellville
 The Settlers High School, Bellville
 Westerford High School, Cape Town

See also
 List of primary schools in South Africa
 Matriculation in South Africa
 National Senior Certificate
 Education in South Africa

References 

List
High Schools in